John Henry Steenhuisen (born 25 March 1976) is a South African politician who has served as the twentieth leader of the Opposition since October 2019 and has been the federal leader of the Democratic Alliance since November 2020, having served as the interim leader for one year from November 2019. He was chief whip of the official opposition from May 2014 until October 2019. Ideologically, Steenhuisen has been described as a classical liberal, a supporter of non-racialism and a firm believer in racial equality.

Born in Durban, he matriculated from  Northwood Boys' High School. Steenhuisen joined the Democratic Party and was elected to the Durban City Council in 1999 as the councillor for Durban North. In 2000, the Democratic Alliance was formed, and he was elected as a councillor of the newly formed eThekwini Metropolitan Municipality in that year's municipal election. He was appointed as the DA's caucus leader in 2006.

After the 2009 elections, he became a member of the KwaZulu-Natal Legislature and was appointed the DA's caucus leader. Soon after, Steenhuisen was elected as the party's KwaZulu-Natal provincial leader, a position he held until he resigned in October 2010, amid an extramarital affair. He joined the National Assembly in July 2011, and he became the Shadow Minister of Co-operative Governance and Traditional Affairs in February 2012 following his appointment by Lindiwe Mazibuko. 

In 2014, Steenhuisen was appointed Chief Whip of the Official Opposition by Mmusi Maimane, the newly elected DA Parliamentary Leader and Leader of the Official Opposition. He served as Chief Whip until October 2019, when Maimane resigned as the official opposition leader and party leader. Shortly afterwards, Steenhuisen was elected unopposed to replace him as the Leader of the Opposition. In November 2019, he was elected interim leader of the DA, after he defeated Makashule Gana, a DA MPL in Gauteng. A year later, he was elected leader for a full term at the party's Federal Congress, defeating Mbali Ntuli, a DA MPL from KwaZulu-Natal.

Early life and education
Steenhuisen was born in Durban and matriculated from Northwood Boys' High School, an English-medium high school in Durban, in 1993. He went on to study a course in political science at the London School of Economics and Political Science, but has never obtained a university degree. He once told Parliament that he had enrolled for a bachelor's degree in politics and law at the University of South Africa in 1994, but he could not finish the course due to work and financial circumstances.

Political career
Steenhuisen started as an ordinary Democratic Party (predecessor to the Democratic Alliance) activist before he became a branch member.

At the age of 22 in 1999, Steenhuisen was elected to the then Durban City Council as the DP councillor for Durban North. He was the youngest municipal councillor at that time. At the 2000 municipal election, the eThekwini Metropolitan Municipality was formed and Steenhuisen was elected as a councillor for the newly established DA. He continued to serve as an ordinary councillor until his appointment as the DA's caucus leader in 2006. In that same year, he was assigned to serve on the city's Executive Committee.

Steenhuisen was elected to the KwaZulu-Natal Legislature in the 2009 general election. The incoming DA caucus elected him as leader, replacing party veteran, Roger Burrows. At the inaugural sitting, he challenged Zweli Mkhize of the African National Congress for the post of premier, but lost after he received 7 votes compared to Mkhize's 68 votes. 

He was elected as the KwaZulu-Natal provincial leader of the Democratic Alliance at the party's Provincial Congress held later that same year. Steenhuisen held this position until 24 October 2010, after he announced on 18 October his intention to resign amid the disclosure of an extramarital affair. Steenhuisen continued to serve as an MPL and the DA's caucus leader until his move to the National Assembly.Steenhuisen joined the National Assembly on 19 July 2011 by replacing Mark Steele, a DA MP who, in turn, assumed Steenhuisen's seat in the KwaZulu-Natal Legislature. In February 2012, Steenhuisen was appointed by Lindiwe Mazibuko as Shadow Minister of Co-operative Governance and Traditional Affairs. He is currently a member of the Rules Committee. He had previously served as a member of the Joint Standing Committee on the Financial Management.
In 2012, he declared his candidacy for deputy chairperson of the DA Federal Council. He lost to Thomas Walters at the party's Federal Congress.

Steenhuisen was appointed as chief whip of the DA parliamentary caucus by Mmusi Maimane on 29 May 2014. He was reappointed to the post in May 2019.

Leadership of the Democratic Alliance

Leadership elections

2019 Interim leadership elections
Mmusi Maimane resigned as both Federal Leader and Parliamentary Leader of the DA in October 2019, causing Steenhuisen to lose the position of chief whip. Steenhuisen's deputy, Jacques Julius, then served as acting chief whip. Steenhuisen declared his candidacy to succeed Maimane as parliamentary leader and was elected unopposed on 27 October 2019. He formally announced on 28 October that he would run for federal leader of the party. He was elected interim leader of the party on 17 November, defeating Gauteng MPL Makashule Gana.

2020 Federal Congress

On 15 February 2020, he declared his intention to seek a full-term as Federal Leader of the DA at the Hellenic Community Centre in Mouille Point, Cape Town. The party was scheduled to elect its new leadership at its Federal Congress in May 2020 but this was postponed due to the COVID-19 pandemic. Consequently, Steenhuisen suspended all campaign activities. 

In May 2020, the DA's Federal Council, the second-highest decision-making body, resolved to hold the conference virtually between 31 October and 1 November, a move which some critics denounced as being favourable to Steenhuisen's campaign, as he has a public profile and access to party structures, giving him an advantage. He faced KwaZulu-Natal MPL Mbali Ntuli for the position. As the campaign progressed, he received endorsements from prominent party members, including Western Cape provincial leader Bonginkosi Madikizela and interim federal chairperson Ivan Meyer. On 1 November 2020, Steenhuisen was announced as the new leader of the party.

2023 Federal Congress
On 1 November 2022, Steenhuisen announced his intention to seek re-election at the DA's Federal Congress in 2023. Steenhuisen launched his campaign for re-election on 19 November in Cape Town.  He told supporters that while things had improved in the DA, there were still challenges. Steenhuisen also conceded that coalitions were diffucult to manage as the party governs four out of the eight metropolitan municipalities and multiple municipalities across the country through coalition governments. Despite the party's ongoing exodus of black leaders and Federal Council Chairperson Helen Zille's strong influence in decision-making, Steenhuisen is considered by political analysts to easily win re-election at the Federal Congress.

Tenure

Election results

Steenhuisen led the Democratic Alliance into the 2021 national municipal elections. He said in an interview with News24 in September 2021: "The DA's core message in this election is not about the ANC. It's about the DA. We are going to be talking with South Africans about what we have to offer. Not just a critique of the ANC, but say, 'The DA gets things done'." On 25 September 2021, Steenhuisen released the DA's election manifesto. He said that the manifesto was a blueprint for “a local government that works".

Throughout the campaign, Steenhuisen warned that voting for smaller parties could aid and abet the ANC and EFF and said that some smaller parties were not interested in taking on the ANC, only the DA. The Inkatha Freedom Party (IFP) called the DA 'arrogant' over its election messages which discouraged voters from voting for smaller political parties. In early-October 2021, the DA put up controversial election placards in the majority Indian suburb of Phoenix in KwaZulu-Natal which read: "The ANC called you racists. The DA called you heroes." During the riots and looting that affected the province in July 2021, residents of Phoenix formed armed citizen vigilantes to protect the community due to the lack of police response. Violent clashes occurred between residents and black people from close townships like Inanda resulted in the deaths of 36 people and increased racial tensions between Black and Indian South Africans. The posters were denounced by several political parties and the DA was accused of exploiting fear and deepening divisions for electoral gain. Steenhuisen defended the posters and said that the party would not apologise for putting them up. The party later apologised for the posters and began removing them.

In the municipal elections of 1 November 2021, the DA's electoral support declined. The party had won 1,396 municipal seats, outright control of 11 municipalities and was the leading party in 23 municipalities. The party had lost 386 seats and outright control of 8 municipalities. Despite the party's decline, the party did win control of the uMngeni Local Municipality in KwaZulu-Natal, making it the first DA-run municipality in the province. In several municipalities and large metropolitan municipalities, no party won an outright majority. The party then held coalition discussions with ActionSA, the Freedom Front Plus, the African Christian Democratic Party and several other political parties. Coalition talks nearly collapsed after the party refused to vote for Herman Mashaba, former DA mayor of Johannesburg and ActionSA president, to become mayor of Johannesburg again. On 22 November 2021, the DA gained back control of the City of Johannesburg and gained control of the City of Ekurhuleni for the first time after ActionSA president Mashaba convinced the Economic Freedom Fighters leadership to vote for the DA mayoral candidates. Coalition talks then resumed and the DA and its coalition partners signed an agreement to govern several municipalities on 16 December 2021.

Internal party affairs
In the early days of Steenhuisen's leadership, he appointed Natasha Mazzone as the new chief whip of the DA parliamentary caucus on 31 October 2019. The party lost control of the City of Johannesburg Metropolitan Municipality in December 2019. In August 2016, then-DA leader Maimane formed an informal alliance with the Economic Freedom Fighters to secure control of several hung municipalities, including Johannesburg with Herman Mashaba of the DA as the city's mayor. Mashaba resigned as mayor in October 2019 and left office in November. A vacancy was therefore created. DA Federal Council Chairwoman Helen Zille and Steenhuisen both opposed a coalition agreement with the EFF. On 4 December, the ANC regained control of the City of Johannesburg. Previous DA coalition partners and a few DA councillors voted for the ANC candidate, Geoff Makhubo.

On 5 December 2020, Steenhuisen announced his Shadow Cabinet. The majority of the positions remained unchanged, with Geordin Hill-Lewis remaining at Finance, Andrew Whitfield at Police and Siviwe Gwarube at Health. He removed Phumzile van Damme as Shadow Minister of Communications and replaced her with Zakhele Mbhele. He also granted Van Damme a health-related sabbatical until March 2021. She subsequently accused Steenhuisen of trying to use her health sideline her. It was claimed that she was being sidelined because she had not supported Steenhuisen candidature as leader of the party The DA disputed Van Damme's accusation, but she vehemently insisted that Steenhuisen had instructed her to cease all her parliamentary duties and go on an unsolicited sabbatical. Steenhuisen then claimed he had made the sabbatical optional and Van Damme could continue with her parliamentary duties. On 12 February 2021, Van Damme announced that her disagreement with Steenhuisen regarding her sabbatical had been resolved and she would return to work, focusing on digital technologies. She later resigned as a DA MP in May 2021, citing a clique of individuals.

On 18 August 2022, Steenhuisen conducted a reshuffle of his shadow cabinet. He promoted the deputy chief whip of the DA parliamentary caucus Siviwe Gwarube to chief whip of the DA caucus, while former chief whip Natasha Mazzone was appointed the National Security Advisor to Steenhuisen. Veteran DA MP Dianne Kohler Barnard was appointed Shadow Minister of  Communications, while Phineas Masipa was appointed Shadow Minister of Agriculture, Land Reform and Rural Development. Solly Malatsi had been re-appointed by Steenhuisen as the party spokesperson after he resigned back in November 2020.
Steenhuisen had been under pressure to remove Mazzone as chief whip by DA MPs. In April 2022, The Sunday Times reported that several senior members of the DA caucus, including Steenhuisen himself, disapproved of Mazzone's performance.

2022 visit to Ukraine

In April 2022, John Steenhuisen went on a six-day 'fact-finding' trip to Ukraine. His trip has been criticized, by many who said that he should focus on local South African issues.  In response, Steenhuisen stated that 'The criticism for visiting Ukraine is not fair and is immature'.  After initially declining to reveal the trip's funders, Steenhuisen later revealed that trip was funded by the Brenthurst Foundation.   Following the trip Steenhuisen held a brief press conference, which did not allow for questions from the press.

COVID-19 pandemic
During the COVID-19 pandemic, the DA launched a coronavirus information channel. On 8 May 2020, Steenhuisen delivered a speech in which he called for the national lockdown to be ended. Steenhuisen called the lockdown “destructive” and said, “there is no longer a justification to keep this hard lockdown in place.” He also said that the DA had written to the International Monetary Fund and filed a PAIA complaint to obtain the minutes of the National Command Council's decision to retain the tobacco ban.

Personal life
He currently resides in Umhlanga (an upmarket suburb in KwaZulu Natal) and is a supporter of the Sharks rugby union team and AmaZulu F.C. football club. Steenhuisen was married for 10 years to Julie Steenhuisen (née Wright), a fellow Durban native. They were divorced in October 2010 amid Steenhuisen's affair with Terrry Beaumont, the wife of the DA's former KwaZulu-Natal director Michael Baeumont.  Steenhuisen has two daughters from his first marriage. He is now married to Terry, and they have a daughter together. He is fluent in both English and Afrikaans. 

In an August 2022 interview on "Podcast and Chill" with MacG and Sol Phenduka, when MacG asked Steenhuisen "What is roadkill?". He responded, jokingly, that it "sounds a lot like my ex-wife… flat chicken." Gender activists stated that "even in jest, falls far short of standards of responsible and gender-sensitive political leadership" and questioned the timing of the joke (made during women's month).

References

External links 

  Mr John Henry Steenhuisen – Parliament of South Africa
 John Steenhuisen Federal Leader – Democratic Alliance

|-
|-

Living people
Democratic Alliance (South Africa) politicians
Members of the National Assembly of South Africa
1976 births
People from Durban
Members of the KwaZulu-Natal Legislature
Alumni of Northwood School, Durban
White South African people
South African people of Dutch descent
People from KwaZulu-Natal